Estetrol (E4), or oestetrol, is one of the four natural estrogenic steroid hormones found in humans, along with estrone (E1), estradiol (E2), and estriol (E3). Estetrol is a major estrogen in the body. In contrast to estrone and estradiol, estetrol is a native estrogen of fetal life. Estetrol is produced exclusively by the fetal liver and is found in detectable levels only during pregnancy, with relatively high levels in the fetus and lower levels in the maternal circulation.

In addition to its physiological role as a native hormone, estetrol can be used as a medication, see estetrol (medication).  Estetrol, in combination with drospirenone, has recently been approved as a new estrogenic component of a combined oral contraceptive (COC) and estetrol alone is in clinical development for the treatment of menopausal symptoms as well as breast and prostate cancer.

Biological function
So far, the physiological function of estetrol remains unknown. The potential role of estetrol as a marker for fetal well-being has been studied quite extensively, but no correlation was found due to the large intra- and inter-individual variation in maternal estetrol plasma levels during pregnancy.

Biological activity
Estetrol has a moderate affinity for estrogen receptors alpha (ERα) and beta (ERβ), with Ki values of 4.9 nM and 19 nM, respectively. As such, estetrol has 4- to 5-fold preference for ERα over ERβ. In different animal models, the potency of estetrol regarding its estrogenic effect observed in vivo is generally 10 to 20 times lower than the potency of ethinyl estradiol (EE) and is also lower than the potency of estradiol.  Estetrol displays a highly selective binding to its primary targets ERα and ERβ, which ensures that estetrol has a low risk of non-specific side effects.

Mode of action

Tissue-selective effect 
Estetrol shows selective estrogenic, neutral or anti-estrogenic activities in certain cell types and tissues. In rodent models, estetrol has shown to elicit potent estrogenic activity on ovulation, brain, bone tissue, cardiovascular system, and uterus, associated with ovulation inhibition, prevention of bone demineralization, cardioprotective effects and maintenance of uterovaginal tissues, respectively.

Data from preclinical studies also suggest that estetrol has anti-estrogenic like effects on the breast and a limited impact on normal or malignant breast tissue when used at therapeutic concentration. This property of estetrol is associated with antagonistic effects on breast cell proliferation, migration and invasion in the presence of estradiol.

The molecular mechanisms of action driving its tissue-selective actions rely on a specific profile of ERα activation, uncoupling nuclear and membrane activation.

In the liver, Estetrol has a neutral activity, which is reflected by a minimal impact on synthesis of hepatic coagulation factors, minimal impact on sex hormone-binding globulin (SHBG) synthesis and limited impact on lipid parameters, including triglycerides.

Estetrol can therefore be described as the first Native Estrogen with Selective Tissue activity (NEST).

Differences vs SERMs 
The selective tissue activity of estetrol is different from the effects of selective estrogen receptor modulators (SERMs), like tamoxifen and raloxifene. Estetrol, like SERMs, has selective tissue activity. However, SERMs interact with the ligand binding domain of ERα in a manner that is distinct from that of estrogens, including estetrol. Estetrol recruits the same co-regulators as other estrogens, while SERMs recruit other co-regulators.

ERα activation 
Estrogens can elicit their effects via nuclear ERα and/or membrane ERα signaling pathways. Estetrol presents a distinctive mode of action in terms of ERα activation. Like other estrogens, estetrol binds to, and activates the nuclear ERα to induce gene transcription. However, estetrol induces very limited activity via membrane ERα in several tissues (e.g. in the breast) and antagonizes this pathway in the presence of estradiol, thereby uniquely uncoupling nuclear and membrane activation.

Biochemistry

Biosynthesis
In the fetal liver, estetrol is synthesized from estradiol (E2) and estriol (E3) by two fetal liver enzymes, 15α- and 16α-hydroxylase, through hydroxylation. Estetrol can be detected in maternal urine from the 9th week of gestation. After birth, the neonatal liver rapidly loses its capacity to synthesize estetrol. During the second trimester of pregnancy, high levels of estetrol can be found in maternal plasma, with steadily rising concentrations of unconjugated estetrol to about 1 ng/mL (>3 nM) towards the end of pregnancy. Fetal plasma levels have been reported to be over 10 times higher than maternal plasma levels at parturition.

Distribution
In terms of plasma protein binding, estetrol displays moderate binding to albumin, and shows no binding to SHBG. The overall low plasma protein binding results in a ~50% free active fraction. This compares to a 1% active form for EE and ~2% for estradiol.  Estetrol is equally distributed between red blood cells and plasma.

Metabolism
Cytochrome P450 (CYP) enzymes do not play a major role in the metabolism of estetrol.  Instead, estetrol undergoes extensive phase 2 metabolism in the liver to form glucuronide and sulphate conjugates. The two main metabolites, estetrol-3-glucuronide and estetrol-16-glucuronide, have negligible estrogenic activity. (see Drospirenone/estetrol)

Excretion
Estetrol is mainly excreted in urine. Estetrol is an end-stage product of metabolism, which is not converted back into active metabolites like estriol, estradiol or estrone.

Chemistry

Estetrol, also known as 15α-hydroxyestriol or as estra-1,3,5(10)-triene-3,15α,16α,17β-tetrol, is an estrane steroid and derivative of estrin (estratriene). It is structurally different from the other estrogens because of the presence of four hydroxyl groups, which explains the abbreviation E4.

Synthesis
Estetrol itself is a naturally-produced estrogen by the human fetal liver. However, for human use, estetrol is synthesized from estrone, which is obtained from phytosterols extracted from soybeans. The synthesis of estetrol results in very pure estetrol (>99.9%) without contaminants.

History
Estetrol was first described in 1965 by Egon Diczfalusy and coworkers at the Karolinska Institute in Stockholm, Sweden, who identified and isolated this novel, native estrogen from late pregnancy urine and from the urine of newborn infants.

References 

Animal reproductive system
Estranes
Estrogens
Hormones of the hypothalamus-pituitary-gonad axis
Hormones of the pregnant female
Human female endocrine system
Phenols
Polyols
Sex hormones
Orphan drugs